The Bhanned in the USA Tour was the first concert tour by American rapper and Internet personality Bhad Bhabie. The tour began on April 14, 2018, in Santa Ana, California and concluded on July 8, 2019 in Amman, Jordan. The tour has promoted Bhabie’s music beginnings, her first singles and songs from her debut mixtape 15, and would often perform unreleased singles from the mixtape in the first legs in her tour, and towards the conclusion of the tour, she would perform singles that were later released in 2019 that were anticipated to be off her debut album.

Background
On September 14, 2016, Bhabie and her mother, Barbara Ann Bregoli, appeared on the Dr. Phil show for the segment "I Want To Give Up My Car-Stealing, Knife-Wielding, Twerking 13-Year-Old Daughter Who Tried To Frame Me For A Crime" to discuss Bhabie's behavior. When Bhabie became aggravated at the laughter that the audience exhibited at her expense of stealing a crew member’s car on set, she responded to them by saying "Catch me outside, how about that?", jokingly challenging them to a fight outside the studio. Her accent made the phrase sound like "Cash me ousside how bout dah" which became a meme and Bhabie became known as the "'Cash Me Outside' Girl". After the clip was remixed by DJ Suede The Remix God into a song, ("Cash Me Outside") entered the Billboard Hot 100, Streaming Songs, and Hot R&B/Hip-Hop Songs charts in its March 4, 2017 issue. The song later turn led to a series of dance videos that were uploaded onto YouTube.

Later that year, she was nominated for the 2017 MTV Movie & TV Awards in the "Trending" category based on the catchphrase.

In early 2017, Bhabie was signed by music manager Adam Kluger and had begun to record music. Her first single "These Heaux" has been released on August 24, 2017, along with the singles "Whachu Know" & "Hi Bich" the following month.

On March 7, 2018, she announced her first tour entitled "Bhanned in the USA Tour" with American Rapper Asian Doll. Later on multiple occasions she had announced more legs and had many shows cancelled for multiple reasons throughout both 2018 & 2019.

Shows

Notes:

 Legs 2 and 6 were known as the Bhanned In Europe Tour.
The London and Birmingham shows in leg 2 however were known as the Bhanned In The UK Tour.
 Leg 4 was known as the Bhanned In Australia Tour.

References

External links
 Bhad Bhabie Shares Bhanned in the USA Tour Dates With Asian Doll - XL
 Bhad Bhabie Gigography, Tour History & Past Concerts – Songkick

2018 concert tours
2019 concert tours
Concert tours of the United States